WWCK (1570 kHz) is a commercial AM radio station in Flint, Michigan. It is owned by Cumulus Media and it broadcasts a classic hits radio format. Its studios are south of the Flint city limits and the AM transmitter is east of downtown Flint near the intersection of Dort Highway and I-69. WWCK carries Michigan State Spartans college football and men's basketball.

By day, WWCK is powered at 1,000 watts. But because 1570 AM is a Mexican clear channel frequency, WWCK must reduce power at night to 179 watts to avoid interference. Programming is also heard on FM translator W297CG at 107.3 MHz, using the same tower as sister station WWCK-FM. The FM frequency is used to brand both stations as "K 107.3".

History

WMRP
As WMRP (Methodist Radio Parish) in the 1960s, it served as a broadcast ministry of the United Methodist Church, featuring MOR music with some Christian talk and teaching shows. The conservative owners of WMRP-AM and WMRP-FM 105.5 (unrelated to today's current WMRP-LP at 104.7) refused to allow any cigarette or alcohol advertising on the stations.

The United Methodist Church decided to sell WMRP-AM/FM in 1971, and the stations were purchased that year by John W. Nogaj, who converted 105.5 to Top 40 and later album rock as WWCK (the calls being a tribute to CKLW in Windsor, Ontario).

WCZN, WLQB, WWMN
The new owner installed a country music format on AM 1570 with the new call sign WCZN ("Your Country Cousin"). The country format was replaced by oldies as "Solid Gold 16" in 1974. In 1975, following the sale of WWCK and WCZN to Reams Broadcasting, WWCK-FM went full-time album rock, and WCZN picked up the Top 40 format.

This was followed by religious programming as WLQB (1976), a female-oriented talk/adult contemporary format as WWMN (1981), and beautiful music/easy listening as WGMZ (picking up the calls and format that were dropped by 107.9 FM when it became WCRZ in 1984).

WWCK
In 1986, AM 1570 became WWCK and began to simulcast WWCK-FM (which switched from AOR to a CHR format on January the 1st of 1989 following the sale of the stations from Reams Broadcasting to Majac of Michigan). Originally a daytime-only station on a Mexican clear channel, a treaty signed between the American and Mexican governments allowed the station to broadcast full-time at reduced power at night in 1986.

Cumulus Media took control of WWCK-AM/FM in March 2000, and a year later, WWCK dropped its simulcast of the FM station in favor of urban contemporary gospel music via ABC Radio's "Rejoice - Musical Soul Food" network. The Gospel format lasted four years.

Talk radio
On March 1, 2004, WWCK switched to a talk radio format. This allowed Flint to once again have a talk station of its own following WFDF AM 910's move into the Detroit radio market as a Radio Disney network affiliate. WWCK featured a roster of mainly syndicated conservative talk show hosts including Mark Levin, John Batchelor and Red Eye Radio.

News, weather, sports, and traffic reports were provided by anchors from WJRT-TV, state news from The Michigan News Network and national/international news from Westwood One News. Weekend programs and hosts included Kim Komando, Joe Pags, Bob Brinker, Leo LaPorte, USA Financial Headquarters, Free Talk Live, and Mike Avery's Outdoor Magazine.

Classic hits and "K 107.3"

On January 1, 2021, WWCK changed its format from talk to classic hits, branded as "K107.3". It also carries Michigan State Spartans football and men's basketball games.

Previous logo

References

Michiguide.com - WWCK History

External links

WCK (AM)
Classic hits radio stations in the United States
Radio stations established in 1946
1946 establishments in Michigan
Cumulus Media radio stations